Osman Bukari (born 13 December 1998) is a Ghanaian professional footballer who plays as a winger for Serbian club Red Star Belgrade and the Ghana national team.

Club career

AS Trenčín
First European club in Osman Bukari's professional career was Slovakian side AS Trenčin. Bukari joined them in July 2018 from Accra Lions in his homeland. In his two years in Slovakian football, Bukari was one of the best players in his team, playing 66 matches and recording 16 goals and 25 assists. In the 2019–20 season, he was officially Trenčin's best player and was inducted in the league's best XI. He was also on the three-name shortlist for the best player of the season.

Gent
After his eye-catching performances in Slovakia, Belgian side KAA Gent signed Bukari on 4 September 2020. After signing a three-year contract with Gent, Bukari quickly established himself as one of the first-team regulars. He played in the UEFA Europa League as Gent faced Hoffenheim, Red Star Belgrade and Slovan Liberec in the group stage. He scored four goals and made six assists in 35 appearances for Gent.

Loan to Nantes
On 12 August 2021, French Ligue 1 outfit FC Nantes signed Bukari  on a season-long loan. The Ghanaian was a part of the team that won Coupe de France, the fourth in club's history, and secured European qualification after a 21-year-long wait.

Red Star Belgrade
Serbian champions Red Star Belgrade signed Bukari on 21 June 2022 in a deal worth €3 million. He made his club debut against Radnički Niš and got on the scoresheet in the same match. He was man of the match with three goals in an assist in Red Star Belgrade's UEFA Champions League qualifying match against Pyunik, in which the Serbian team won 5–0. Bukari scored one of the best goals seen in Eternal derby when he scored with a fine left-footed volley in Red Star Belgrade's 1–1 draw at rivals Partizan.

International career
Bukari made his Ghana bow on 25 March 2021 against South Africa in an Africa Cup of Nations qualifying match. Good performances on the club level for FC Nantes and Red Star Belgrade earned him a Black Stars recall and he's been a regular for the national team since March 2022. He scored his first goal for his country on 1 June 2022 in an AFCON qualifier against Madagascar. Bukari has been called up by national coach Otto Addo to represent the Black Stars in the 2022 World Cup. In his World Cup debut, Bukari scored in the 90th minute in a 3–2 loss to Portugal, and performed the renowned celebration of their captain Cristiano Ronaldo.

Career statistics

Club

International goals
 Scores and results list Ghana's goal tally first, score column indicates score after each Bukari goal.

Honours 
Nantes
 Coupe de France: 2021–22

Individual
 Slovak Super Liga Team of the Season: 2019–20

References

External links
 
 
 
 
 Futbalnet profile
 
 

1998 births
Living people
Footballers from Accra
Ghanaian footballers
Ghana international footballers
Association football midfielders
AS Trenčín players
K.A.A. Gent players
FC Nantes players
Red Star Belgrade footballers
Slovak Super Liga players
Belgian Pro League players
Ligue 1 players
Ghanaian expatriate footballers
Ghanaian expatriate sportspeople in Slovakia
Expatriate footballers in Slovakia
Ghanaian expatriate sportspeople in Belgium
Expatriate footballers in Belgium
Ghanaian expatriate sportspeople in France
Expatriate footballers in France
Ghanaian expatriate sportspeople in Serbia
Expatriate footballers in Serbia
2022 FIFA World Cup players